Andreas Kokas (born 24 June 1997) is a Greek professional footballer who plays as a left-back for Super League 2 club Olympiacos Volos.

Personal life
Kokas’ twin brother, Dimos, is also a professional footballer.

Honours
Volos
Football League: 2018–19

References

1997 births
Living people
Greek footballers
Greek expatriate footballers
Football League (Greece) players
Gamma Ethniki players
Cypriot Second Division players
Olympiacos Volos F.C. players
Nafpaktiakos Asteras F.C. players
Volos N.F.C. players
P.O. Xylotymbou players
Association football defenders
Footballers from Patras